The 1994 British League Division Two season was contested as the second division of Speedway in the United Kingdom. The British League Divisions 2 and 3 were disbanded after this season and did not return until 1997. An Academy League was introduced.

Summary
The title was won by the Glasgow Tigers.

Final table

British League Division Two Knockout Cup
The 1994 British League Division Two Knockout Cup was the 27th edition of the Knockout Cup for tier two teams. Glasgow Tigers were the winners of the competition for the second successive year.

First round

Quarter-finals

Semi-finals

Final
First leg

Second leg

Glasgow were declared Knockout Cup Champions, winning on aggregate 101–91.

Final leading averages

Riders & final averages
Edinburgh

Kenny McKinna 8.40
Les Collins 8.23
Scott Lamb 7.85
Vesa Ylinen 7.68
Jan Andersen 7.12
Lawrence Hare 5.48
Kevin Little 4.91
Peter Scully 3.62

Exeter

Paul Fry 7.66
Antonín Šváb Jr. 6.99
Václav Verner 6.44
David Smart 6.38
Mark Simmonds 6.29
Mika Pellinen 6.24
Andreas Bossner 5.30
Scott Pegler 4.87
Nigel Leaver 3.73
Tommy Palmer 3.52
Henk Bangma 2.29

Glasgow

Nigel Crabtree 9.74 
David Walsh 9.72 
Robert Nagy 9.18 
Mick Powell 7.22 
Sean Courtney 6.36
James Grieves 6.01
Jesper Olsen 4.90
Stewart McDonald 3.67

Long Eaton

Jan Stæchmann 10.10
Martin Dixon 8.94
Neil Collins 8.07
Richard Hellsen 7.86
Steve Johnston 7.48
Stuart Swales 4.47
Mike Hampson 3.89
Mark Bruton 2.74
Scott Kirton 2.00

Middlesbrough
 
Paul Bentley 9.39 
Jens Rasmussen 7.01
Darren Sumner 6.99
Alan Mogridge 6.71
Stuart Swales 6.08
Mike Smith 5.96
Paul Whittaker 5.5
Chris Readshaw 4.25
Will Beveridge 1.79

Newcastle

Mark Thorpe 8.95 
Scott Robson 7.39
Garry Stead 7.19
Richard Juul 6.67
Petri Kokko 6.15
Stuart Robson 4.95
Chris Readshaw 4.94
Max Schofield 4.85
Anthony Barlow 2.55

Oxford

Mick Poole 8.44 
Martin Goodwin 7.65 
Darren Sumner 7.06 
Alan Grahame 6.96
Niklas Karlsson 6.86
David Smart 6.15
Rene Madsen 5.85
Stefan Ekberg 5.54
Andy Meredith 4.55
Stephen Morris 4.48
Spencer Timmo 2.75

Peterborough

Zdeněk Tesař 9.13
Carl Stonehewer 8.33 
Ronni Pedersen 7.60 
Ryan Sullivan 7.09
Eric Monaghan 6.72
Ian Barney 4.57
Jason Gage 4.51
Scott Nicholls 3.35
Darren Shand 3.15

Sheffield

Roman Matoušek 8.22 
George Štancl 7.65
Alan Mogridge 6.86
Shawn Moran 6.35
Greg Bartlett 5.94
Rod Colquhoun 5.36
Robbie Kessler 5.00
Rob Woffinden 5.00
Shawn Venables 4.26
Steve Knott 4.13
Louis Carr 3.57

Swindon

Tony Olsson 10.07
Tony Langdon 8.05
David Blackburn 6.81
Gary Chessell 6.63
Patrik Olsson 6.44
Glenn Cunningham.5.53
John Jefferies 1.96

See also
List of United Kingdom Speedway League Champions
Knockout Cup (speedway)

References

Speedway British League Division Two / National League